A banner of arms is a type of heraldic flag which has the same image as a coat of arms, i.e. the shield of a full heraldic achievement, rendered in a square or rectangular shape of the flag.

The term is derived from the terminology of heraldry but mostly used in vexillology. Examples of modern national flags which are banners of arms are the flags of Austria, Iraq, and Switzerland.

The banner of arms is sometimes simply called a banner, but a banner is in a more strict sense a one of a kind personal flag of a nobleman held in battle.

Examples

National flags

Subdivision flags

County flags

City flags

Organization flags

References

External links
 

Types of flags